Tuure Jaakko Kalervo Junnila (24 July 1910, in Kiikka – 21 June 1999) was a Finnish economist and politician. He served as Minister of Finance from 17 November 1953 to 4 May 1954. He was a member of the Parliament of Finland from 1951 to 1962, from 1966 to 1979, from 1983 to 1987 and from 1990 to 1991, representing the National Coalition Party.

References

1910 births
1999 deaths
People from Kiikka
People from Turku and Pori Province (Grand Duchy of Finland)
National Coalition Party politicians
Ministers of Finance of Finland
Members of the Parliament of Finland (1951–54)
Members of the Parliament of Finland (1954–58)
Members of the Parliament of Finland (1958–62)
Members of the Parliament of Finland (1966–70)
Members of the Parliament of Finland (1970–72)
Members of the Parliament of Finland (1972–75)
Members of the Parliament of Finland (1975–79)
Members of the Parliament of Finland (1983–87)
Members of the Parliament of Finland (1987–91)
20th-century Finnish economists
University of Helsinki alumni
Academic staff of the University of Helsinki
Finnish anti-communists